Euparixia is a genus of aphodiine dung beetles in the family Scarabaeidae. There are about 12 described species in Euparixia.

Species
These 12 species belong to the genus Euparixia:

 Euparixia boliviana Gordon & Mccleve, 2003
 Euparixia bruneri Chapin, 1940
 Euparixia campbelli Gordon & Mccleve, 2003
 Euparixia costaricaensis Hinton
 Euparixia costaricensis Hinton, 1936
 Euparixia duncani Brown, 1927
 Euparixia formica Hinton, 1934
 Euparixia isthmia Gordon & Mccleve, 2003
 Euparixia mexicana Gordon & McCleve, 2003
 Euparixia moseri Woodruff & Cartwright, 1967
 Euparixia panamaensis Gordon & Mccleve, 2003
 Euparixia panamensis Gordon & McCleve

References

Further reading

 
 
 

Scarabaeidae genera
Articles created by Qbugbot